Roy James Gaines (August 12, 1937 – August 11, 2021) was an American Texas blues and electric blues guitarist, singer and songwriter. He wrote and recorded the song "A Hell of a Night", which was first issued on his 1982 album Gainelining. He was the younger brother of the blues musician Grady Gaines.

Biography
Gaines was born in Waskom, Texas on August 12, 1937, and relocated with his family to Houston when he was six years old. Originally a piano devotee, Gaines moved to playing the guitar in his adolescence. In his teens he was acquainted with another budding guitarist, Johnny Copeland. By the age of 14 he had performed onstage backing his hero, T-Bone Walker, and played in Houston nightclubs. He later moved to Los Angeles, California. In 1955, Gaines played as a backing musician on recordings by Bobby Bland, Junior Parker and Big Mama Thornton. He later backed Roy Milton and then Chuck Willis, and he worked again with Walker.

He released two low-key albums in 1956 and a couple more in the 1960s for small record companies. In 1966, Gaines became part of Ray Charles's backing band. He was also a backing musician in sessions with the Everly Brothers, the Supremes, Bobby Darin, Stevie Wonder, and Gladys Knight.

He worked primarily as a sideman, but he released a solo album, Gainelining, in 1982. He also had a small part in the 1985 film The Color Purple. Another album, New Frontier Lover, was released in 2000. It was followed by Tuxedo Blues, featuring a big band billed as Roy Gaines & His Orchestra, released in 2009. The album includes the song "Miss Celie's Blues (Sister)," which Gaines had performed in The Color Purple. Also included is a cover version of Michael Jackson's "Rock with You."  Gaines co-wrote the song "No Use Crying", which was recorded by George Jones and Ray Charles.

Gaines died on August 11, 2021, a day before his 84th birthday.

Discography

Albums

With the Jazz Crusaders
Freedom Sound (Pacific Jazz, 1961)
With Les McCann 
Another Beginning (Atlantic, 1974)

References

External links
Roy Gaines Interview NAMM Oral History Library (2017)

1937 births
2021 deaths
American blues guitarists
American male guitarists
American blues singers
Songwriters from Texas
Musicians from Houston
Texas blues musicians
People from Waskom, Texas
Guitarists from Texas
20th-century American guitarists
20th-century American male musicians
Black & Blue Records artists
American male songwriters